The 2016 Ballon d'Or was an award given to the best-performing football player around the world in 2016.

In September 2016, France Football announced that their partnership with FIFA for the FIFA Ballon d'Or award had come to an end and that they would revive the Ballon d'Or award, treating the 2016 edition as the 61st award.

France Football announced that they would publish a shortlist of 30 players across six announcements with two hour intervals on 24 October 2016. On 12 December 2016, Cristiano Ronaldo won the award by a record margin of 429 points ahead of second placed Lionel Messi and Antoine Griezmann, who came third. 

There were 173 voters. All were journalists, in a change from previous years, and each voter was from a different country. Each voter voted for three players who received 5 points, 3 points and one point respectively.

Ronaldo scored 745 points out of a maximum possible of 865. It was his fourth Ballon d'Or, the most of any European player in the history of the award.

Rankings
Sources:

References

2016
2016 in association football
2016 sports awards